Agriophara musicolor is a moth in the family Depressariidae. It was described by Edward Meyrick in 1930. It is found in New Guinea.

The wingspan is 23–24 mm. The forewings are light green with a basal patch occupying one-fifth of the wing more or less suffused with dark fuscous, the edge rounded or angulated. There are semi-oval dark fuscous spots on the costa at one-third and the middle, from the first an oblique fascia of blackish irroration crossing the wing to the dorsal streak, some blackish sprinkling beyond this in the upper part of the disc, some undefined spots of whitish suffusion on both sides of the fascia. There are four subconfluent small dark fuscous spots separated by whitish on the apical third of the costa, where a strongly excurved dark fuscous subterminal line, sharply indented towards the costa, runs to before the tornus, preceded by a thick light grey streak mixed whitish-green continued along the dorsum to one-fourth. There is a terminal series of dark fuscous spots. The hindwings are grey-whitish.

References

Moths described in 1930
Agriophara
Moths of New Guinea